Third cabinet of Azerbaijan Democratic Republic governed Azerbaijan Democratic Republic (ADR) between December 26, 1918 and March 14, 1919. It was formed after the second cabinet of Azerbaijan Democratic Republic dissolved on December 7, 1918 and was led by Prime Minister of Azerbaijan Fatali Khan Khoyski with the following composition:

See also
Cabinets of Azerbaijan Democratic Republic (1918-1920)
Current Cabinet of Azerbaijan Republic

References

Cabinets of Azerbaijan
Government ministers of Azerbaijan
Cabinets established in 1918
Cabinets disestablished in 1919
1918 establishments in Azerbaijan
1919 disestablishments in Azerbaijan